Spongolite is a stone made almost entirely from fossilised sponges. It is light and porous.

The silica spicules fossilised with the sponges makes the material hazardous to handle by being highly abrasive. Because the spicules are embedded in soft fossils, the abrasion damage is not as immediately apparent as it would be from sandpaper or rough bricks.

Spongolite is obtained from mines in Mount Barker, Western Australia and Mato Grosso do Sul, Brazil. There are also large deposits near Esperance, Western Australia.

Sedimentary rocks